Antonio Gandolfi (February 20, 1835 – March 20, 1902) was an Italian soldier and politician. He was the 2nd Italian Governor of Eritrea. He was a recipient of the Silver Medal of Military Valor.

In June 1890 Francesco Crispi, president of the Council, appointed him Governor of Eritrea.

References
 Policarpo Guaitoli, Ricordanze patrie. Miscellanea di notizie carpigiane, Carpi, Pederzoli e Rossi, 1882–1883, vol. 2, Famiglia Gandolfi;
 Angelo Del Boca, Gli italiani in Africa orientale. Dall'Unità alla marcia su Roma, Roma-Bari, Mondadori, 1976;
 Nicola Labanca, La politica della memoria. Le carte inedite di Antonio Gandolfi, 'Governatore Civile e Militare della Colonia Eritrea''', «Ricerche storiche», XIX (1989), n. 2, pp. 375–402;
 Angelo Del Boca, Antonio Gandolfi, in Dizionario biografico degli italiani, Roma, Istituto della Enciclopedia italiana, vol. 52 (1999), pp. 157–159.

External links
 Biografia e scheda ISAAR (CPF) di Antonio Gandolfi – Biblioteca dell'Archiginnasio di Bologna 
 Scheda ISAD(G) del Fondo Antonio Gandolfi – Biblioteca dell'Archiginnasio di Bologna 
 Mostra documentaria in rete Eritrea 1885-1898. Fotografi, generali e geografi sulle sponde del Mar Rosso. Gli inizi della politica coloniale italiana'' della Biblioteca dell'Archiginnasio di Bologna 

1835 births
1902 deaths
19th-century Italian politicians
Italian military personnel
Recipients of the Silver Medal of Military Valor
Recipients of the Order of Saints Maurice and Lazarus
19th-century Italian military personnel